Diocese (or Bishopric) of Mahajanga may refer to:

 the Anglican Diocese of Mahajanga
 the Roman Catholic Diocese of Mahajanga